Fresno is a 1986 American television comedy miniseries that parodied prime time soap operas of the time such as Falcon Crest, Dallas, and Dynasty. Fresno was directed by Jeff Bleckner. The series featured high production values, including lavish haute couture gowns by leading costume designer Bob Mackie, a main cast including Carol Burnett, Teri Garr, Charles Grodin and Dabney Coleman, and supporting cast including Charles Keating, Pat Corley, Louise Latham, Tom Poston and Henry Darrow.  It was noted at the time as being the first American satirical TV comedy to be made in the then-popular miniseries format.

Plot

In 1581 conquistadors exploring California name a valley "Fresno" after the bitter taste of its grapes. In present-day Fresno, the raisin-growing empire of the once-wealthy Kensington family are locked in a struggle with their former business partner Tyler Cane. The Kensingtons are pinning their hopes on a new grape variety they have developed. Foreman Juan is charged with getting the prototype raisins to the patent office in Sacramento, but on the way is ambushed by Cane's men, who destroy the shipment. Juan is saved by a stranger, Torch. He accompanies Juan back to the ranch, and is hired as a ranch-hand. As Charlotte shows Torch around the ranch, she explains how, 20 years earlier, her late husband Yancey fell out with Cane, and then died in a "bizarre dehydrator accident". Torch begins to investigate the Kensingtons' affairs, awakening suspicions in Charlotte about Yancey's death, and her interest in finding her real parents.

Attempting to save the business, Cane Kensington strikes a deal with Mr. Acme, owner of Acme Toxic Waste. He pays Cane to allow him to dump toxic waste into Duke Lake, a private dam owned by Cane's neighbor Ethel Duke, and main water source for both the ranches. Suspecting that their meeting may have been overheard by the maid, Bobbi Jo Bobb, Cane decides to get send her to Bakersfield. However, Cane's patronage upsets Bobbi Jo's husband Billy Joe, leading to tragic consequences.

Duke's water rights are crucial to Cane and the Kensingtons. Cane visits Duke, offering to buy the water rights, but she refuses. Later that day, in Fresno, Charlotte is outmaneuvered by Cane, who takes control of the annual Raisin Festival and vows to erase the Kensington name from Fresno forever. That night, Billy Joe listens to Bobbi Jo on the radio, and becomes enraged when she makes a dedication to Cane. He shoots the radio, but the bullet ricochets off it, killing Ethel Duke. Billy Joe is arrested and charged with murder. Public defender Desiree DeMornay is assigned the case.

Nature-loving Kevin finds dead fish floating in Duke Lake, and soon discovers a leaking Acme Toxic Waste drum at the bottom of the river. Kevin confronts Mr. Acme, who orders his henchmen to kill Kevin, but they blow up Acme's truck by mistake. Juan confronts Charlotte and demands a raise at gunpoint, but instead Charlotte cuts his wages in half. Cane makes an anonymous phone call to the police, implicating Kevin in the death of Duke, and Kevin is also arrested and charged with murder.

Duke's death triggers a struggle between Cane and the Kensingtons to buy the water rights from Duke's husband, Earl. Tyler bribes Earl, but Cane learns of Tyler's bid, and outbids him. That night, Charlotte goes to Earl's to seduce him, but her plan is ruined when she discovers that Tyler has sent Candy Cane, who emerges from Earl's bathroom clad only in a towel.

Charlotte visits Kevin in jail, where she learns his bail has been set at $250,000. Cane blackmails Mr. Acme into paying him an additional $300,000, so he can buy the water rights. He rushes to the bank to clear the check, but Charlotte arrives just after he leaves, and withdraws most of the money. Tiffany meets Torch at a Fresno restaurant and asks for his help in finding her real parents. Back at the jail, Kevin and Billy Joe deduce that Cane is behind the entire conspiracy. Bobbi Jo arrives, but when she learns of Talon's attempt to seduce her husband, she suspects the worst and rejects him.

Rushing back to Earl's, Cane tries to stop Tyler from buying the water rights, but when Earl phones the bank to verify Cane's check, he learns it is worthless because Charlotte withdrew money to pay Kevin's bail. Ethel's attorney arrives: he explains that Earl cannot sell the water rights because Earl will not inherit Ethel's estate until the reading of the will at 2pm tomorrow.

Cast

Starring
 Carol Burnett as Charlotte Kensington
 Dabney Coleman as Tyler Cane
 Gregory Harrison as Torch
 Teri Garr as Talon Kensington
 and Charles Grodin as Cane Kensington
Also starring
 Luis Avalos as Juan
 Pat Corley as Earl Duke
 Valerie Mahaffey as Tiffany Kensington
 Anthony Heald as Kevin Kensington
 Teresa Ganzel as Bobbi Jo Bobb
 Bill Paxton as Billy Joe Bobb
 Jerry Van Dyke as Tucker Agajanian
 Charles Keating as Charles
 Melanie Chartoff as Desiree DeMornay
 Michael Richards & J. E. Freeman as Henchmen
Special guest appearance by
 Jeffrey Jones as Mr. Acme
Guest starring
 Louise Latham as Ethel Duke
 Henry Darrow as Commandant
 Tammy Lauren as Candy Cane
 Natalie Gregory as China Kensington
 Tom Poston as Doc Parseghian
 George D. Wallace as Judge Henry Bejajian
 Dakin Matthews as Prosecutor
 Raye Birk as Mr. Loats
 Thomas Hill as Mr. Crowther
 Jack Kehler as Sgt. Cooper
 Todd Susman as Sgt. Dobbs

Production
Fresno was created and co-written by Barry Kemp, Mark Ganzel, and Michael Petryni, and was produced for CBS by Mary Tyler-Moore's MTM Productions. The miniseries was directed by Jeff Bleckner, who had previously directed episodes of some of the shows parodied in Fresno, including Dynasty, Knots Landing, and Falcon Crest.

The miniseries starred Carol Burnett and Dabney Coleman, with Charles Grodin, Teri Garr, Valerie Mahaffey, Bill Paxton, Anthony Heald, Gregory Harrison, Luis Avalos, Jerry Van Dyke, Charles Keating, Pat Corley, and Jeffrey Jones.

The production shot for two days in the city of Fresno, California, in July 1986, completing its remaining 53 days in Los Angeles. The music was composed by John Morris, and the Emmy-nominated gowns worn by the female leads were designed by Bob Mackie.  It was executive produced by Barry Kemp.

Fresno was screened three times in the United States in 1986, 1987 and 1989. It premiered at 8 pm on Sunday 16 November 1986 with a two-hour series opener, followed by four further one-hour episodes over the next four days.

Episodes

Awards and nominations
 1987 Casting Society of America Artio Award for Best Casting for TV Miniseries
 1987 Emmy Award for Outstanding Achievement in Hairstyling for a Miniseries or a Special
 1987 Emmy Award for Outstanding Art Direction for a Miniseries or a Special
 1987 Emmy Award for Outstanding Costume Design for a Miniseries or a Special
 1987 Emmy Award for Outstanding Editing for a Miniseries or a Special
 1987 Emmy Award for Outstanding Sound Editing for a Miniseries or a Special

References

External links
 

1980s American satirical television series
1986 American television series debuts
1986 American television series endings
1980s American television miniseries
Television shows set in Fresno, California
Television soap opera parodies
Television series by MTM Enterprises